Badminton at the 2011 Pacific Games in Nouméa, New Caledonia was held on September 5–9, 2011.

Medal summary

Medal table

Results

References

Badminton at the 2011 Pacific Games

External links
Tournament result at www.tournamentsoftware.com

2011 Pacific Games
Pacific Games
2011
Badminton in New Caledonia